"Dakota" (released in the United States as "Dakota (You Made Me Feel Like the One)") is a song by Welsh alternative rock band Stereophonics. It was the first single taken from their fifth studio album, Language. Sex. Violence. Other?, and was released on 28 February 2005. "Dakota" was the first and to date only Stereophonics single to reach number one and the last to reach the top ten on the UK Singles Chart and to chart on the US Billboard Modern Rock Tracks chart. It also became the band's highest-charting single in both Australia and New Zealand. The song has been compared to the works of U2.

Writing
Kelly Jones started writing the music for "Dakota" in January 2004. He was staying in a hotel room in Paris while Stereophonics were on a promo tour for You Gotta Go There To Come Back and was trying to find a new sound. A month later, while the band were on tour in the United States, he wrote the lyrics in Vermillion (in South Dakota) and the song's working title was originally named after it. After Slipknot released a song from their third album entitled "Vermilion" and Mercury Rev released their sixth album with a song included on it also called "Vermillion", the band decided to change the title of the song. The name of the song was changed to "Dakota", named after the apartment building in New York City. One of the song's signature lines, "Take a look at me now", was first used—in a similar melody—in their earlier single "Since I Told You It's Over".

Promotion
Then BBC Radio 1 DJ Jo Whiley was the first to play "Dakota" on air. Kelly and Richard Jones presented the song as part of Radio 1's "10 albums to watch for 2005".

US radio airplay
"Dakota" was the first Stereophonics single to achieve success on alternative rock radio stations in the United States—where it was promoted as "Dakota (You Made Me Feel Like the One)". After its American release on 21 March 2005, the single steadily gained ground on US alternative rock radio, notably on stations such as WFNX, WBCN and KROQ-FM. "Dakota" continued to gain support across the US and eventually became the first Stereophonics song to chart on the Billboard Modern Rock Tracks chart. It first charted on 9 July 2005, almost half a year after its original release. The song peaked at number 34 on the chart and remained on the chart for six weeks. It was their first and so far only single to make the chart.

Release
Four weeks before the official release of the single, "Dakota" was released exclusively on the iTunes Store. The song was also available for download from the band's website. The single was released in the United Kingdom on 28 February 2005 across four formats: a CD single, maxi single, vinyl single and DVD single. "Dakota" was included as the opening track on Stereophonics' first greatest hits compilation album Decade in the Sun.

Music video
The music video for "Dakota" was filmed in South Dakota, United States. It features Stereophonics on a road trip through Dakota on the back of a truck. As the video goes on, the band pass various Dakota sights including Mount Rushmore. The video was given an exclusive showing on MTV before it was shown on other music channels.

Reception

Critical response
"Dakota" received positive reviews. AllMusic editor MacKenzie Wilson said the song had "glossy guitar hooks" when reviewing the album. Along with the songs "Brother" and "Girl" she stated that they "find Stereophonics' second coming to be a convincing one." On the "Readers 100 Greatest Tracks of 2005" at Q, "Dakota" was placed 8th. James Masterton named the song his single of the year in 2005. Alexis Petridis from The Guardian praised the song for replacing their "standard smug lumbering with an urgent synthesizer pulse" and its "breezy, radio-smashing chorus."

Pete Cashmore from NME was critical towards "Dakota" for sounding like a U2 stadium song and being "too concerned with making an impressive noise and not concerned enough with a tune."

Commercial performance
"Dakota" gave Stereophonics their first UK number one single as it topped both the Singles and Download charts. It remained in the charts for 44 weeks and ranked at number 40 on the year-end charts. It was also the band's first single to chart on the US Modern Rock Tracks chart, peaking at number 34. In Ireland the song peaked at number 8 and remained in the chart for seven weeks.

Track listings

Personnel

Stereophonics
 Kelly Jones – vocals, guitar, piano
 Richard Jones – bass guitar
 Javier Weyler – drums

Technical
 Production – Kelly Jones, Jim Lowe
 Mixing – Kelly Jones, Jim Lowe
 Engineering – Jim Lowe

Charts

Weekly charts

Year-end charts

Certifications

Release history

Cover versions
Show of Hands recorded a cover version for their 2010 album Covers 2.

In popular culture
"Dakota" made appearances in the video games FIFA Manager 06 and Pro Evolution Soccer 2010. The song features at the beginning of an episode of the BBC comedy Him & Her.

See also
 2005 in British music
 List of UK Singles Chart number ones of the 2000s

References

2005 singles
2005 songs
Number-one singles in Scotland
Songs written by Kelly Jones
Stereophonics songs
UK Independent Singles Chart number-one singles
UK Singles Chart number-one singles
V2 Records singles